Amma is an Indian crime drama television series that premiered on June 25, 2016, on Zee TV. It was created by Farhn P. Zamma. The show is based on the female underworld don of Mumbai, Jenabai Daruwali.

Synopsis
The show explores the life of a female underworld figure through five decades. It adds the love story of Amma's daughter Rehanna and Faisal. Faisal is one of Amma's gangsters, The show follows them as they face trials and tribulations, so that Amma would accept them and they could marry. A small side love story describes Rehanna's sister Saraswati who loves Atul, her college friend. The show depicts Amma's reaction when she finds out about the romance.

Cast
Urvashi Sharma as Zeenat Sheikh 
Nasirr Khan as Abbas Sheikh
Shabana Azmi as Old Zeenat Sheikh 
Aman Verma as Shekeran "Anna" Shetty (character based on Varadarajan Mudaliar)
Neha chandra as "Laxmi Shetty" "Anna's wife" 
Nishigandha Wad as Lakshmi Shetty 
Ashmit Patel as Faisal Qureshi
Yuvika Chaudhary as Rehana Sheikh
Nawab Shah (actor) as Haider Ali Qazi (character based on Haji Mastan)
 Ziya Siddique as Saraswati Shetty
Zakir Hussain as Police Commissioner K. N. Dayal 
Meghna Naidu as Hanaan
 Raju Kher as Faakir
 Ajaz Khan as Azhar Yeda
Syed Ashraf Karim as Naeem Qureshi
Jeetu Verma as Inspector P. K. Prajapati
Sikandar Kharbanda as ACP Atul Sahay
Shawar Ali as Parvez Khan
Deepraj Rana as Kabeer Lal (character based on Karim Lala)
Sonal Parihar as Ghazzala
 Rahul Verma Rajput
 Shashi Kiran
 Jitendra Bohara as Tariq Qureshi brother of Faisal Qureshi
 Kanchan Awasthi as Sarla

References

External links
Official website

2016 Indian television series debuts
2016 Indian television series endings
Hindi-language television shows
Indian drama television series
Indian period television series
Television shows set in Mumbai
Television series about organized crime
Zee TV original programming
Indian crime television series
Indian political television series
Works about organised crime in India